Fairwood may refer to:


Place names

South Africa
Fairwood, Gauteng, a suburb of Johannesburg

United Kingdom
Fairwood, Swansea, an electoral ward of Swansea, Wales
Fairwood, Wiltshire, a hamlet in England
Fairwood Common, an area of common land in the Gower Peninsula, Wales

United States
Fairwood, Maryland, a census-designated place
Fairwood, Spokane County, Washington, a census-designated place in Spokane County
Fairwood, King County, Washington, a census-designated place in King County

Other uses
Fairwood (restaurant), fast-food restaurant chain in Hong Kong and China
Fairwood Press, American publishing company
, a Hansa A Type cargo ship in service 1960-63